Monumental Possession is the second studio album by Norwegian black metal band Dødheimsgard. It was released in 1996, through the record label Malicious. It is their second and final completely black metal album, before the band incorporated industrial and avant-garde elements into their sound on future releases. Monumental Possession was re-released in 1999 by Century Media Records.

Track listing 

All lyrics written by Aldrahn.

 "Intro" – 1:27
 "Utopia Running Scarlet" – 3:23
 "The Crystal Specter" – 3:50
 "Bluebell Heart" – 4:16
 "Monumental Possession" – 5:44
 "Fluency" – 3:37
 "Angel Death" – 3:54
 "Lost in Faces" – 4:56
 "The Ultimate Reflection" – 6:03

Personnel

 Aldrahn – vocals, guitar
 Vicotnik – drums, vocals
 Jonas Alver – bass guitar
 Apollyon – guitar, vocals

References 

1999 albums
Dødheimsgard albums